Ercheia mahagonica is a species of moth of the family Erebidae first described by Saalmüller in 1891. It is found in Ghana and Madagascar.

References

Moths described in 1891
Ercheiini
Moths of Africa